The 2018 Utah Utes football team represented the University of Utah during the 2018 NCAA Division I FBS football season. The Utes were led by 14th-year head coach Kyle Whittingham and played their home games in Rice–Eccles Stadium in Salt Lake City, UT. They were members of the South Division of the Pac-12 Conference.

The Utes completed the regular season with a 6–3 record in conference play, winning the South Division for the first time since joining the Pac-12 Conference in 2011. In the Pac-12 Championship Game, the team lost to North Division champion Washington by a score of 10–3. They were invited to the Holiday Bowl to play Big Ten Conference runner-up Northwestern, where the Utes lost by a score of 31–20 to end the year at 9–5 overall.

Utah was led on offense by quarterback Tyler Huntley until he suffered a season-ending collarbone fracture in the game against Arizona State on November 3. Redshirt freshman Jason Shelley started for the rest of the season. Running back Zack Moss compiled 1,096 rushing yards and 11 touchdowns. Two members of the Utah offensive line earned first-team all-conference honors, Jordan Agasiva and Jackson Barton. Utah's defense featured four members of the first-team All-Pac-12: defensive linemen Bradlee Anae and Leki Fotu, linebacker Chase Hansen, and cornerback Jaylon Johnson. Hansen led the conference in tackles for loss with 22, and Anae tied for the conference lead in sacks with 8.

Previous season
The Utes finished the 2017 season 7–6, 3–6 in Pac-12 play to finish in fifth place in the South Division. They were invited to the Heart of Dallas Bowl where they defeated West Virginia.

Preseason

Position key

Recruits
The Utes signed a total of 20 recruits.

Award watch lists
Listed in the order that they were released

Pac-12 Media Days
The 2018 Pac-12 media days are set for July 25, 2018 in Hollywood, California. Kyle Whittingham (HC), Chase Hanson (LB) & Lo Falemaka (OL) at Pac-12 Media Days. The Pac-12 media poll was released with the Utes predicted to finish in second place at Pac-12 South division.

Schedule
Utah announced their 2018 football schedule on November 16, 2017. The Utes will play FCS Weber State and Northern Illinois and returning to the traditional last game of the year spot, Utah will play in-state rival BYU Cougars football in out-of-conference play. In Pac-12 conference play, the Utes will not play cross-divisional foes California and Oregon State.

Source:

Game summaries

Weber State

at Northern Illinois

Washington

at Washington State

at Stanford

Arizona

USC

at UCLA

at Arizona State

Oregon

at Colorado

BYU

The Utes scored 28 unanswered points and overcame a 27–7 deficit in the third quarter to defeat their in-state rival, the BYU Cougars, for the eighth consecutive time.

vs. Washington (Pac-12 Championship Game)

vs. Northwestern (Holiday Bowl)

Rankings

Players drafted into the NFL

References

Utah
Utah Utes football seasons
Utah Utes football